Mary Ann Mobley (February 17, 1937 – December 9, 2014) was an American actress, television personality, and Miss America 1959.

Career
Mobley was born in 1937 in Biloxi, Mississippi. After her reign as Miss America 1959, Mobley embarked on a career in both film and television. She signed a five-year contract with MGM. She made her first television appearances on Be Our Guest in 1960, followed by five appearances on Burke's Law from 1963 to 1965. In 1966 she was the female guest star on the first two-part episode of Mission: Impossible, in the episode “Old Man Out.” She went on to make multiple appearances on Perry Mason, Love, American Style, and Fantasy Island. She played a recurring role as Maggie McKinney Drummond on Diff'rent Strokes in the final season of the series, having taken over the role from Dixie Carter. She also played Arnold’s teacher on Diff'rent Strokes in season 2, episode 24. In Carter's later series, Designing Women, Mobley guest-starred as Karen Delaporte, the snide head of a historical society, who crosses swords with Carter's character, Julia Sugarbaker. She made two films with Elvis Presley in 1965, Girl Happy and Harum Scarum.

She was given the Golden Globe Award for New Star of the Year – Actress in 1965. She was active in many charitable causes and was awarded the Outstanding Young Woman of the Year Award in 1966 by Lady Bird Johnson.

Mobley also made occasional appearances on Match Game as one of the celebrity panelists from 1973 to 1977. From 1984 to 1988, Mobley joined husband Gary Collins in co-hosting the Pillsbury Bake-Off on CBS.

She appeared in the documentary film Miss America, which PBS aired as the January 27, 2002, episode of  American Experience.

Mobley is briefly depicted in the third season of the Amazon Prime series The Marvelous Mrs. Maisel, played by Amanda Dela Cruz.

Miss America
Mobley was crowned Miss America 1959, the first Mississippian to achieve this honor, winning the national talent award.

Mobley joined husband Gary Collins as co-host of the 1989 Miss America pageant in September 1988, the 30th anniversary year of her own Miss America victory.

Personal life
Mobley grew up in Brandon, Mississippi, and graduated from Brandon High School. She was a member of Chi Omega sorority at the University of Mississippi, and in 1981 was inducted into the University of Mississippi Alumni Hall of Fame.

She married actor and television host Gary Collins in 1967 at Brandon United Methodist Church.

The couple separated in 2010 but reconciled and were living in Biloxi when Collins died on October 13, 2012. Collins and Mobley had one daughter together, Mary Clancy Collins. Mobley was also stepmother to Melissa Collins and Guy William Collins, children from his first marriage.

Health and death
Mobley had Crohn's disease and had at times been an activist for improvements in treatment.

She was treated in 2009 for Stage III breast cancer. Mobley died at her home in Beverly Hills, California, on December 9, 2014, aged 77, from breast cancer.

Filmography

Film
1964: Get Yourself a College Girl - Teresa "Terry" Taylor
1965: Girl Happy - Deena
1965: Young Dillinger - Elaine
1965: Harum Scarum - Princess Shalimar
1966: Three on a Couch - Susan Manning
1967: The King's Pirate - Princess Patna
1968: For Singles Only - Anne Carr

Television

1960: Be Our Guest (CBS daytime TV show)
1963: General Hospital - Jonelle Andrews (1979)
1963-1965: Burke's Law - Teri / Cindy / Girl / Denise / Sugar
1964-1966: Perry Mason - Sharon Carmody / Dianne Adler
1965-1966: Run for Your Life - Laura Bronson / Clarice Newell
1966: The Man from U.N.C.L.E. - April Dancer
1966: Mission: Impossible - Crystal Walker
1967: The Virginian - Ellie Willard
1967: The Legend of Custer - Ann L'Andry
1968: Istanbul Express (TV Movie) - Peggy Coopersmith
1969: My Dog the Thief, Part 1 (TV Movie) - Kim Lawrence
1969: My Dog the Thief, Part 2 (TV Movie) - Kim Lawrence
1969–1973: Love, American Style - Linda / Joanne Fergusson / Carol / Pat
1969: Ironside - Marcy Atkins
1972: Search - Lilia Moen
1973: The Partridge Family - Audrey Parson
1973–1977: Match Game - Herself - Panelist
1974: The Girl on the Late, Late Show (TV Movie) - The Librarian
1974–1977: Tattletales - Herself
1977: The Fantastic Journey - Rhea
1978–1984: Fantasy Island - Bryana Spencer / Nancy Carsons / Florence Richmond / Linda Roth / Amanda DeHaven / Ellie Drake / Sheila Crane / Pamela Deering
1978–1985: The Love Boat (3 episodes) - Annette Epshaw / Marion Vail / Mrs. Diller
1979-1980  “Whew!” (TV Game Show) - Herself - Celebrity Contestant
1980–1986: Diff'rent Strokes - Maggie McKinney Drummond / Nancy Osborne
1980: Vega$ - Paula Conway
1984: Hotel - Catherine Stevens
1986: Super Password - Herself - Celebrity Contestant
1986: Rosie (as Sally Sugarbaker) Episode: "Peach's Sweet Treats"
1988: Falcon Crest (4 episodes) - Dr. Beth Everdene
1990: Designing Women - Karen Delaporte
1992: Hearts Afire - Mary Fran Smithers
1999: Sabrina, the Teenage Witch - Mary Ann Mobley
2003: Dead Like Me (TV Series) - Mary Ann Mobley (final appearance)

References

External links
  
 
 

1937 births
2014 deaths
Actresses from Mississippi
American film actresses
American television actresses
American television personalities
American women television personalities
Deaths from cancer in California
Deaths from breast cancer
Miss America 1950s delegates
Miss America Preliminary Talent winners
Miss America winners
Miss Mississippi winners
New Star of the Year (Actress) Golden Globe winners
People from Biloxi, Mississippi
People from Brandon, Mississippi
University of Mississippi alumni
Metro-Goldwyn-Mayer contract players
20th-century American actresses
People with Crohn's disease
21st-century American women